The following is a list of football stadiums in Estonia, ordered by seating capacity. Only stadiums with a seating capacity of 500 or more are included.

Current stadiums

Future stadiums
Stadiums which are currently being renovated or in development:

Indoor football facilities
List of indoor football fields in Estonia:

See also
List of European stadiums by capacity
List of association football stadiums by capacity

References

External links 
 Football stadiums in Estonia – Estonian Football Association
 Stadiums in Estonia

 
Estonia
Football stadiums
Football stadiums